Leyla Firdevs Bağcı (born February 6, 1990) is a Turkish-Dutch women's football goalkeeper. She played in the Netherlands and Belgium, and was part of the Turkey women's national team.

Early years
Leyla Firdevs Bağcı was born to Turkish immigrant parents in Dordrecht on February 6, 1990. She grew up together with her six-year younger sister in her hometown, an island with rich history, where she still lives.

She began football playing at the age of seven with boys on the street. She tried swimming and taekwondo before she and her father finally opted for football. Her mother advised her spouse that football playing would be best for Leya because she found Leyla's skills and technique insufficient for martial arts. She was supported in her passion especially by her father Sabri Kenan Bağcı, the president of the "Turkish Sports Clubs Federation in the Netherlands"  (HTSKF) and the "Federation of People from Yozgat in the Netherlands", who played football at regional level in his youth in his hometown Yozgat, Turkey. He took her by the hand and got her registered in a local football club.

Playing career
Leyla Bağcı was admitted to the mixed-gender children's team of the FC Dordrecht (DFC) at the age of ten. She was chosen to play in the goalkeeper position as she was taller than her boy peers in the team. She was selected to play in the mixed team at regional level when she was fifteen years old, and at age seventeen she appeared in the mixed-gender Western Holland regional team.

Club
Willem II
Bağcı transferred to the Tilburg-based Willem II, which competed in the Dutch Women's Eredivisie. She trained about half an hour almost every day without missing a training session although she was a substitute from the first day on. She played for SC 't Zand in the same city, which were in cooperation with Willem II. Due to financial reasons, the women's football section of Willem II was closed.

RVVH Ridderkerk
After the closure of Willem II, Bağcı consciously joined RVVH in Ridderkerk, where she remained sitting on the reserve bench. She continued to take part at the training.

Standard Fémina de Liège
In January 2012, she transferred to the Belgian club Standard Fémina de Liège competing in the Super League Vrouwenvoetbal, becoming their first goalkeeper.

SteDoCo
In June 2012, she returned to the Netherlands, and joined SteDoCo from Hoornaar.

Royal Antwerp F.C. 
In July 2013, she went again to Belgium to play for Antwerp FC Ladies, a newcomer to the BeNe League.

International
When Leyla Bağcı was eighteen years old, she was called up to the Netherlands women's national under-19 team for qualification. After the training session, she told to the selective and technical staff that although born and raised in the Netherlands, she has her heart go out to the Turkey women's national team. Her preference was welcomed by the Dutch responsible people.

In 2010, she was called up to the Turkey women's national football team camp at the age of twenty. She was not admitted to the team because unfit.

The next year, Bağcı was offered a substitute goalkeeper place in the Turkey women's national team to participate at the UEFA Women's Euro 2013 qualifying – Group 2 matches. In the match against Kazakhstan on October 22, 2011, she had to remain seated on the reserve bench. She debuted in the away match against Romania on October 27, 2011, entering the game in the 82nd minute to replace Fatma Şahin. She played as the first goalkeeper in the home match against Romania on November 23, 2011. She defended the goal of Turkey in the match against Germany on February 15, 2012, and against Switzerland on March 31, 2012.

In August 2013, Bağcı was named for the national team's participation at the 2015 FIFA Women's World Cup qualification – UEFA Group 6. However, she stood away due to her intensive preparatory training sessions at her new club Antwerp FC Ladies in Belgium.

Private life
Bağcı holds a diploma in sports massage and a tcoaching certificate (TC3) in Sport and Movement from the Albeda College in Rotterdam.

She started a training for police officer career in Amsterdam. However, she broke off her decision after she received a call from the Belgian club Royal Antwerp F.C.

She appeared on the football club's calendar of Royal Antwerp F.C. as a cover girl.

References

External  links
 

Living people
1990 births
Footballers from Dordrecht
Dutch people of Turkish descent
Women's association football goalkeepers
Turkish women's footballers
Turkey women's international footballers
Women's footballers in the Netherlands
Willem II (women) players
Expatriate women's footballers in Belgium
Women's footballers in Belgium
Standard Liège (women) players
Royal Antwerp F.C. (women) players